Wendy Hilliard (born December 11) in Detroit, Michigan, is a United States Gymnastics Hall of Fame Member, and was the first African-American rhythmic gymnast to compete as a member of the U.S. national team. Wendy was the first African-American to represent the United States in rhythmic gymnastics in international competition, including three World Championships (1979, 1981, and 1983). Wendy coached 1996 Olympian Aliane Baquerot Wilson. She served as the first African-American President of the Women’s Sports Foundation from 1995 to 1996, and was also an Olympic sportscaster and Broadway performer. She was also the Director of Sports for the New York City 2012 Olympic Bid.

In 1996, Wendy founded the Wendy Hilliard Gymnastics Foundation, which has provided free and low-cost gymnastics for over 15,000 urban youth in New York City. In the fall of 2016, she expanded her gymnastics programs to Detroit, which serves over 200 youth every week through its after school classes.

References

External links
 

1960 births
Living people
African-American female gymnasts
American gymnasts
American nonprofit executives
Women's Sports Foundation executives
21st-century African-American people
21st-century African-American women
20th-century African-American sportspeople
20th-century African-American women